Peirce Seamount, also called Pierce Seamount, is a seamount located in the Pacific Ocean west of the Queen Charlotte Islands, British Columbia, Canada. It lies between Denson Seamount and Hodgkins Seamount and is member of the Kodiak-Bowie Seamount chain, a chain of seamounts in southeastern Gulf of Alaska stretching from the Aleutian Trench in the north to Bowie Seamount in the south.

See also
 List of volcanoes in Canada
 Volcanism of Canada
 Volcanism of Western Canada

References
 British Columbia Marine Topography updated 1 April 2014.

External links
Seamount Catalog -- Peirce Seamount

Seamounts of the Pacific Ocean
Volcanoes of British Columbia
Seamounts of Canada